Knoutsodonta maugeansis is a species of sea slug, a dorid nudibranch, a shell-less marine gastropod mollusc in the family Onchidorididae.

Distribution
This species was described from Australia. It is found in Victoria and Tasmania.<ref>Burn, R. & Wilson, R., 2011, [http://portphillipmarinelife.net.au/species/4998 Nudibranch, Onchidoris maugeansis], in Taxonomic Toolkit for marine life of Port Phillip Bay, Museum Victoria, accessed 22 Jan 2016.</ref>

DietKnoutsodonta maugeansis feeds on the encrusting bryozoan, Beania magellanica''.

References

Onchidorididae
Gastropods described in 1958